White Township is a township in Beaver County, Pennsylvania, United States. The population was 1,318 at the 2020 census. It is part of the Pittsburgh metropolitan area.

Geography

Surrounding neighborhoods
White Township has four borders, including West Mayfield to the north, Beaver Falls to the east and southeast, Patterson Township to the Southwest and Chippewa Township to the west.

Demographics

As of the census of 2000, there were 1,434 people, 628 households, and 396 families residing in the township.  The population density was 1,978.1 people per square mile (769.0/km2).  There were 667 housing units at an average density of 920.1/sq mi (357.7/km2).  The racial makeup of the township was 87.31% White, 9.97% African American, 0.35% Native American, 0.42% Asian, 0.21% Pacific Islander, 0.42% from other races, and 1.32% from two or more races. Hispanic or Latino of any race were 0.84% of the population.

There were 628 households, out of which 28.7% had children under the age of 18 living with them, 45.5% were married couples living together, 14.6% had a female householder with no husband present, and 36.8% were non-families. 32.2% of all households were made up of individuals, and 11.9% had someone living alone who was 65 years of age or older.  The average household size was 2.28 and the average family size was 2.86.

In the township the population was spread out, with 24.0% under the age of 18, 8.4% from 18 to 24, 27.6% from 25 to 44, 25.5% from 45 to 64, and 14.6% who were 65 years of age or older.  The median age was 36 years. For every 100 females there were 84.3 males.  For every 100 females age 18 and over, there were 78.7 males.

The median income for a household in the township was $34,375, and the median income for a family was $39,293. Males had a median income of $31,382 versus $20,625 for females. The per capita income for the township was $16,354.  About 9.8% of families and 11.2% of the population were below the poverty line, including 22.2% of those under age 18 and 4.6% of those age 65 or over.

References

Populated places established in 1789
Townships in Beaver County, Pennsylvania
1789 establishments in Pennsylvania